Helford Passage (meaning Estuary Beach) is a village in west Cornwall, England, United Kingdom. It is situated on the north bank of the Helford River opposite Helford approximately five miles (8 km) south-southwest of Falmouth. The village is in the civil parish of Mawnan; before 1986, it was in the parish of Constantine.

A pedestrian ferry operates daily from Easter to October between Helford Passage and Helford

Helford Passage lies within the Cornwall Area of Outstanding Natural Beauty (AONB).

The gardens at Trebah, the National Trust's Glendurgan Garden, are a short walk away.

References

External links

Villages in Cornwall
Mawnan